1785 in sports describes the year's events in world sport.

Boxing
Events
 7 June — Bill Harvey defeated Harry Sellers in a 20-minute fight at Ash Fields.

Cricket
Events
 First definite mention in the sources of Billy Beldham. The rise of the White Conduit Club foreshadowed a shift of direction by cricket's hierarchy from rural Hampshire to metropolitan London. 
England
 Most runs – Richard Stanford 124 
 Most wickets – Richard Hosmer 7

Horse racing
England
 The Derby – Aimwell
 The Oaks – Trifle
 St Leger Stakes – Cowslip

References

 
1785